Juraj Faith (born 14 March 1976) is a Slovak former professional ice hockey forward.

Faith played in the Slovak Extraliga for HC Košice, HK Spišská Nová Ves, HK Poprad, HKm Zvolen, MHC Martin, MsHK Žilina and MHk 32 Liptovský Mikuláš. He also played in the Deutsche Eishockey Liga for Wölfe Freiburg, the Ligue Magnus for Scorpions de Mulhouse and the English Premier Ice Hockey League for the Manchester Phoenix.

Personal life
His father Jan Faith played professional ice hockey for HC Košice and the Czechoslovakia national team.

External links

1976 births
Living people
Slovak ice hockey forwards
HK Dukla Michalovce players
DVTK Jegesmedvék players
EHC Freiburg players
HC Košice players
HC Nové Zámky players
HK Poprad players
HK Spišská Nová Ves players
HKM Zvolen players
Manchester Phoenix players
MHC Martin players
MHk 32 Liptovský Mikuláš players
MsHK Žilina players
Scorpions de Mulhouse players
Sportspeople from Košice
Slovak expatriate ice hockey players in Germany
Expatriate ice hockey players in England
Expatriate ice hockey players in France
Expatriate ice hockey players in Hungary
Slovak expatriate sportspeople in Hungary
Slovak expatriate sportspeople in England
Slovak expatriate sportspeople in France